is a private university in Kita, Tokyo, Japan, established in 1993.

The Tokyo Seitoku University Jyujo campus hosts departments for childcare, business administration and international relations. Additional departments of humanities and applied psychology are located in Yachiyo City, Chiba.

External links

 Official website 

Educational institutions established in 1993
Private universities and colleges in Japan
Universities and colleges in Tokyo
1993 establishments in Japan